Pontogeneia is a genus of amphipods in the family Pontogeneiidae. It contains the following species:

Pontogeneia andrijashevi Gurjanova, 1951
Pontogeneia arenaria Bulycheva, 1952
Pontogeneia bartschi Shoemaker, 1948
Pontogeneia inermis (Kroyer, 1838)
Pontogeneia intermedia Gurjanova, 1938
Pontogeneia ivanovi Gurjanova, 1951
Pontogeneia kondakovi Gurjanova, 1951
Pontogeneia littorea Ren, 1992
Pontogeneia melanophthalma Gurjanova, 1938
Pontogeneia opata J. L. Barnard, 1979
Pontogeneia redfearni Thurston, 1974
Pontogeneia rostrata Gurjanova, 1938
Pontogeneia stocki Hirayama, 1990

References

Gammaridea